is a Japanese voice actress and singer from Tokyo, Japan. She is affiliated with Aoni Production. She was signed into Aniplex until 2007. She was chosen out of 2,000 people from the "Gonna be a star" auditions (hosted by Sony Music Entertainment Japan) for the title role in the OVA Le Portrait de Petit Cossette.

Filmography

Television animation
2004
 Gakuen Alice (Misaki Harada)
 Tactics (Rosalie)
 Tsukuyomi: Moon Phase (Kōhei Morioka (child version))
 Yakitate!! Japan (Kanmuri Shigeru)
2005
 Ginban Kaleidoscope (Mika Honjō)
 Hell Girl (Kaoruko Kurushima)
2006
 009-1 (Mia Connery (009-7))
 D.Gray-man (Elda)
 Kiba (Rebecca)
 Nerima Daikon Brothers (Karakuri Yukika and others)
 Zegapain (Minato)
2007
 Baccano! (Eve Genoard)
 Bakugan Battle Brawlers (Akira, Ryo, Jewls/Nae, Konba, Rabeeder/Shire)
 El Cazador de la Bruja (Lirio)
 Gakuen Utopia Manabi Straight! (Mutsuki Uehara)
 Getsumen To Heiki Mina (Mina Tsukuda, Mina Tsukishiro)
 Hayate the Combat Butler (Wataru Tachibana, Shion Kuresato)
 Magical Girl Lyrical Nanoha Strikers (Erio Mondial, Wendy, Cinque)
 Minami-ke (Kana Minami)
 Moetan (Shizuku)
 Mushi-Uta (Kasuou)
 Ōkiku Furikabutte (Ruri Mihashi)
 Sayonara Zetsubō Sensei (Chiri Kitsu)
 Shakugan no Shana Second (Pheles)
 Suteki Tantei Labyrinth (Rakuta Koga)
 Gurren Lagann (Yoko Littner)
 Toward the Terra (Seki Leigh Shiroei)
2008
 Akaneiro ni Somaru Saka (Tsukasa Kiryu)
 Amatsuki (Tsuruume)
 Hidamari Sketch x 365 (Tōdō) (ep 8)
 Kyōran Kazoku Nikki (Madara)
 Minami-ke: Okawari (Kana Minami)
 Sekirei (Tsukiumi)
 Skip-Beat! (Kyōko Mogami)
 Someday's Dreamers: Summer Skies (Honomi Asagi)
 Toshokan Sensō (Iku Kasahara)
 Zoku Sayonara Zetsubō Sensei (Chiri Kitsu)
2009
 Hayate the Combat Butler 2nd Season (Wataru Tachibana)
 Kämpfer (Natsuru Senō)
 Maria Holic (Matsurika Shinōji)
 Metal Fight Beyblade (Hikaru Hazama)
 Minami-ke: Okaeri (Kana Minami)
 Umineko no Naku Koro ni (Jessica Ushiromiya)
 Valkyria Chronicles (Alicia Melchiott)
 Zan Sayonara Zetsubō Sensei (Chiri Kitsu)
2010
 Black Butler II (Luka Macken)
 Cobra the Animation (Ellis Lloyd)
 Hidamari Sketch x Hoshimittsu (Tōdō) (ep 11)
 Highschool of the Dead (Rei Miyamoto)
 Major (Sophia Reed)
 Marvel Anime: Iron Man (Aki)
 Metal Fight Beyblade Baku (Hikaru Hazama)
 Sekirei: Pure Engagement (Tsukiumi)
 Uragiri wa Boku no Namae o Shitteiru (Touko Murasame)
 Yumeiro Patissiere (Francoise)
2011
 Haganai (Yozora Mikazuki)
 Digimon Xros Wars: The Young Hunters Who Leapt Through Time (Tagiru Akashi)
 Freezing (Chiffon Fairchild)
 Kyoukai Senjou no Horizon (Nate Mitotsudaira)
 Infinite Stratos (Laura Bodewig)
 Kämpfer für die Liebe (Natsuru Senō)
 Maria Holic Alive (Matsurika Shinōji)
 Metal Fight Beyblade 4D (Hikaru Hazama)
 Oniichan no Koto Nanka Zenzen Suki Janain Dakara ne!! (Iroha Tsuchiura)
 Rio: Rainbow Gate! (Rio Rollins Tachibana)
 Sket Dance (Momoka Kibitsu)
 Softenni (Sumino Kiba)
2012
 Chousoku Henkei Gyrozetter (Kakeru Todoroki)
 Danball Senki W (Ami Kawamura)
 Hagure Yuusha no Estetica (Haruka Nagase)
 Kyoukai Senjou no Horizon II (Nate Mitotsudaira)
 Shakugan no Shana Final (Pheles / Saihyō Firesu)
 Smile PreCure! (Nao Midorikawa/Cure March)
2013
 Attack on Titan (Armin Arlert, Narrator)
 Haganai NEXT (Yozora Mikazuki)
 Date A Live (Tohka Yatogami)
 Inu to Hasami wa Tsukaiyou (Kirihime Natsuno)
 Galilei Donna (Anna Hendrix)
 Infinite Stratos Season 2 (Laura Bodewig)
 Kill la Kill (Maiko Ōgure)
 Log Horizon (Kanami)
 Minami-ke: Tadaima (Kana Minami)
 Yahari Ore no Seishun Love Come wa Machigatteiru (Yumiko Miura)
2014
 Buddy Complex (Anessa Rossetti)
 Buddy Complex Kanketsu-hen: Ano Sora ni Kaeru Mirai de (Anessa Rossetti)
 Date A Live II (Tohka Yatogami)
 Hunter × Hunter (2011) (Amane)
 M3 the dark metal (Suzaki, young Akashi)
 The Seven Deadly Sins (Jericho)
 No-Rin (Kochou Yoshida)
 Oneechan ga Kita (Marina Mochizuki)
 Psycho-Pass 2 (Mizue Shisui)
 The Irregular at Magic High School (Mari Watanabe)
 Wizard Barristers: Benmashi Cecil (Quinn Erari)
 Pocket Monsters XY (Elle (Aria in English))
2015
 Attack on Titan: Junior High (Armin Arlert, Narrator)
 Chaos Dragon (Ibuki)
 Log Horizon 2 (Kanami)
 Owarimonogatari (Sodachi Oikura)
 Punchline (Yūta Iritatsu)
 Magical Girl Lyrical Nanoha Vivid (Erio Mondial, Cinque Nakajima, Wendy Nakajima)
 Rin-ne (Sakura Mamiya)
 Unlimited Fafnir (Kili Surt Muspelheim)
 My Teen Romantic Comedy SNAFU TOO! (Yumiko Miura)
 Gintama (Ikeda Asaemon)
2016
 My Hero Academia (Momo Yaoyorozu)
 Beyblade Burst (Valt Aoi)
 Crayon Shin Chan (Samurai Girl (Ep. 902))
 Rin-ne Season 2 (Sakura Mamiya)
 March Comes in like a Lion (Kyouko Kouda)
 Magic Kyun! Renaissance (Louis Anjō (child))
2017
 Attack on Titan Season 2 (Armin Arlert, narrator)
 My Hero Academia Season 2 (Momo Yaoyorozu)
 Beyblade Burst God (Valt Aoi)
 Rin-ne Season 3 (Sakura Mamiya)
March Comes in like a Lion 2nd Season (Kyouko Kouda)
 Owarimonogatari Season 2 (Sodachi Oikura)
2018
 Laid-Back Camp (Sakura Kagamihara)
 Darling in the Franxx (Nana)
 The Seven Deadly Sins: Revival of the Commandments (Jericho)
 Beyblade Burst Super Z (Valt Aoi, Naru Akaba)
 My Hero Academia Season 3 (Momo Yaoyorozu)
 Attack on Titan Season 3 (Armin Arlert, narrator)
 The Girl in Twilight (Chloé Morisu)
 Karakuri Circus (Vilma Thorne)
2019
 Date A Live III (Tohka Yatogami)
 Beyblade Burst GT (Valt Aoi)
 Cop Craft (Cameron Estefan)
 YU-NO: A Girl Who Chants Love at the Bound of this World (Amanda)
 Isekai Cheat Magician (Smyera)
My Hero Academia Season 4 (Momo Yaoyorozu)
 Attack on Titan Season 3 Part 2
2020
 Beyblade Burst Superking (Valt Aoi)
 Pocket Monsters 2019 (Sonia)
 Jujutsu Kaisen (Mai Zenin)
 Warlords of Sigrdrifa (Yayoi Amatsuka)
 Attack on Titan: The Final Season (Armin Arlert, narrator)
2021
 Log Horizon: Destruction of the Round Table (Kanami)
 Beyblade Burst Dynamite Battle (Valt Aoi)
 My Hero Academia Season 5 (Momo Yaoyorozu)
 Shinkansen Henkei Robo Shinkalion Z (Akeno Myōjō)
 The Honor Student at Magic High School (Mari Watanabe)
 The Fruit of Evolution (Artoria Gremm)

2022
 Attack on Titan: The Final Season Part 2 (Armin Arlert, narrator)
 Miss Shachiku and the Little Baby Ghost (Kaori)
 Date A Live IV (Tohka Yatogami)
 Smile of the Arsnotoria the Animation (Hammit)
 My Hero Academia Season 6 (Momo Yaoyorozu)
 Urusei Yatsura (Ryōko Mendō)
 Chainsaw Man (Denji, young)

2023
 Tōsōchū: The Great Mission (Luna Nishidōin)
 Demon Slayer: Kimetsu no Yaiba (Nakime)

TBA
 The Demon Sword Master of Excalibur Academy (Leonis)

Animated films
 Doraemon: Nobita's Space Heroes (2015) (Aron)
 The Irregular at Magic High School: The Movie – The Girl Who Summons the Stars (2017) (Mari Watanabe)
 Pretty Cure All Stars New Stage: Friends of the Future (2012) (Nao Midorikawa/Cure March)
 Smile PreCure! The Movie: Big Mismatch in a  Picture Book! (2012) (Nao Midorikawa/Cure March)
 Pretty Cure All Stars New Stage 2: Friends of the Heart (2013) (Nao Midorikawa/Cure March)
 Pretty Cure All Stars New Stage 3: Eternal Friends (2014) (Nao Midorikawa/Cure March)
 Hugtto! PreCure Futari wa Pretty Cure: All Stars Memories (2018) (Nao Midorikawa/Cure March)
 Aura: Maryūinkōga Saigo no Tatakai (Yumina Ōshima)
 Broken Blade (Narvi)
 Date A Live: The Movie – Mayuri Judgement (Tohka Yatogami)
 Goku Sayonara Zetsubou Sensei (Chiri Kitsu)
 Hayate the Combat Butler (Wataru Tachibana)
 Hidamari Sketch x 365 Specials (Tōdō)
 Kite Liberator (Monaka Noguchi / Sawa)
 Le Portrait de Petit Cossette (Cossette d'Auvergne)
 Negima: Ala Alba (Kotaro Inugami)
 Zokuowarimonogatari (2018) (Sodachi Oikura)
 My Hero Academia: Two Heroes (2018) (Momo Yaoyorozu)
 My Hero Academia: Heroes Rising (2019) (Momo Yaoyorozu)
 The Island of Giant Insects (2019-2020) (Enoki Inaho)
 Bubble (2022) (Undertaker)
 Laid-Back Camp Movie (2022) (Sakura Kagamihara)
 Doraemon: Nobita's Sky Utopia (2023) (Marimba)
 Sailor Moon Cosmos (2023) (Kō Seiya/Sailor Star Fighter)

Original video animation
 Tokyo Marble Chocolate (2007) (Miki)

Video games
 Ace Attorney 6 (Akane Hōzuki)
 Action Taimanin (Su Jinglei)
 Attack on Titan (Armin Arlet, narrator)
 Angel Profile (Teresa)
 Another Eden (Biaka)
 Arcana Heart series (Petra Johanna Lagerkvist)
 Arknights (Pallas)
 Atelier Ayesha: The Alchemist of Dusk (Ayesha Altugle)
 Atelier Shallie: Alchemist of the Dusk Sea (Ayesha Altugle)
 Atlantica Online - Mercenary (Necromencer Riva Fuast) Japanese voice
 Azur Lane - MNF Jean Bart, FFNF Richelieu
 Beyblade Burst (Valt Aoi)
 Beyblade Burst God (Valt Aoi)
 Beyblade Burst Battle Zero (Valt Aoi)
 Blue Dragon (2006) (Shu)
 Cardfight!! Vanguard Dear Days (Rasen Ichidoji)
 Chaos Rings (Musiea)
 Cookie Run: Kingdom (2021) (White Lily Cookie)
 Date A Live: Rinne Utopia (Tohka Yatogami)
 Dead or Alive Paradise (Rio Rollins Tachibana)
 Dissidia Final Fantasy Opera Omnia (Sherlotta)
 Dragalia Lost (Lea)
 Dragon Quest: Heroes (Bianca Whitaker)
 Elsword (Elesis)
 Epic Seven (Luna)
 Fate/Grand Order (Fairy Knight Gawain - Barghest)
 Final Fantasy Type-0 (Caetuna)
 Final Fantasy Type-0 HD (Caetuna)
 Gakuen Utopia Manabi Straight! Kirakira Happy Festa (Mutsuki Uehara)
 Genso Suikoden: Tsumugareshi Hyakunen no Toki (Murat)
 Getsumen To Heiki Mina -Futatsu no Project M- (Tsukuda Mina, Tsukishiro Mina)
 Granado Espada (Japanese version) (Calypso/Calyce)
 Girls' Frontline (OTs-14), (6P62)
 Goddess of Victory: Nikke (Helm)
 Hayate no Gotoku! Boku ga Romio de Romio ga Boku de (Wataru Tachibana)
Honkai Impact 3rd (2021), (Elysia)
 Infinite Stratos: Archetype Breaker (2017), (Laura Bodewig) 
 Lufia: Curse of the Sinistrals (Selan)
 Magia Record (2020), (Jun Kazari)
 No More Heroes: Heroes' Paradise (Sylvia Christel)
 Omega Quintet (Momoka)
 Persona 3 Portable (Female Protagonist)
 Persona Q2: New Cinema Labyrinth (P3P Heroine)
 Punishing: Gray Raven (Vera)
 River City Girls 2 (Marian)
 Sorairo no Fūkin -Remix- (Floria)
 The Seven Deadly Sins: Grand Cross (2019) (Jericho)
 Steal Princess (Anis)
 Street Fighter X Tekken (Christie Monteiro)
 Super Heroine Chronicle (2014) (Laura Bodewig)
 2nd Super Robot Wars Z (Yoko)
 So Ra No Wo To: Otome no Quintet (Kyrie Kuon)
 Tales of Graces (Kohak Hearts, Kamenin, Dark Kamenin)
 Tales of Hearts (Kohak Hearts)
 Tales of VS. (Kohak Hearts)
 Tales of the Heroes: Twin Brave (Kohak Hearts)
 Umineko When They Cry (Jessica Ushiromiya)
 Valkyrie Anatomia: The Origin (Aurora)
 Valkyria Chronicles series (Alicia Melchiott)
 Valkyrie Connect (Compassion God Baldr)
 Warriors All-Stars (Rio Rollins Tachibana)
 YU-NO: A Girl Who Chants Love at the Bound of this World (2017) (Amanda)
 My Hero: One's Justice (2018), Momo Yaoyorozu
 Onmyoji (Yuki Douji, Oguna, Gaki)
 Senran Kagura Peach Beach Splash (Soji)
 Honkai Impact 3rd (Elysia)
 Counter:Side (Machine Collector)

Tokusatsu
 Tensou Sentai Goseiger (Matroid Metal Alice of the Agent) (eps 33 - 44)
 Kaizoku Sentai Gokaiger (Metal Alice of the Agent) (ep 40)

Dubbing

Live-action

Animation

Discography

Singles

Other songs
  (Minami-ke theme song, with Rina Satou and Minori Chihara)
  (Minami-ke ending theme, with Rina Satou and Minori Chihara)
  (Minami-ke: Okaeri theme song, with Rina Satou and Minori Chihara)
  (Minami-ke: Okaeri ending theme, with Rina Satou and Minori Chihara)
  (Akane-iro ni Somaru Saka ending theme)
 "Four season's memory" (Akane-iro ni Somaru Saka ending theme)
 "trust" (Tales Of Hearts )
  (Maria Holic ending theme, with Yu Kobayashi and Asami Sanada)
 "Get a Chance!" (Mahou Sensei Negima! ~Mou Hitotsu no Sekai~ ending theme, with Rina Satou)
 "Dokkyûn☆Heart" (Umineko no Naku Koro ni, Jessica Ushiromiya theme song, insert song (ep. II-I)
  (Kämpfer ending theme, with Megumi Nakajima)
 "Sekirei" (Sekirei opening theme, with Saori Hayami, Hanazawa Kana & Aya Endō)
 "Dear Sweet Heart" (Sekirei ending theme, with Saori Hayami, Hanazawa Kana & Aya Endō)
 "Hakuyoku no Sekiyaku ~Pure Engagement~" (Sekirei ~Pure Engagement~ opening theme, with Saori Hayami, Hanazawa Kana & Aya Endō)
 "Onnaji Kimochi" (Sekirei ~Pure Engagement~ ending theme, with Saori Hayami, Hanazawa Kana & Aya Endō)
 "The Regrettable Neighbours Club" (Boku wa Tomodachi ga Sukunai opening theme, with Kanae Itō, Nozomi Yamamoto, Misato Fukuen, Kana Hanazawa, and Yuka Iguchi)
 "My Feelings" (Boku wa Tomodachi ga Sukunai ending theme.)
 "Be My Friend" (Boku wa Tomodachi ga Sukunai NEXT opening theme, with Kanae Itō, Nozomi Yamamoto, Misato Fukuen, Kana Hanazawa, and Yuka Iguchi)
 "Bokura no Tsubasa" (Boku wa Tomodachi ga Sukunai NEXT ending theme.)
 "Yakusoku no Umi" (Uragiri wa Boku no Namae wo Shitteiru with Jun Fukuyama)
  (Minami-ke: Tadaima theme song, with Rina Satou and Minori Chihara)
  (Inu to Hasami wa Tsukaiyou theme song, with Kazuhito Harumi, Kirihime Natsuno, Asumi Kana, Itou Shizuka, Ai Kakuma and Yu Serizawa) and *Far Away (Attack on Titan Character Image Song) Released May,2017
 "Mathemagics" (Owarimonogatari opening theme)
  (Owarimonogatari opening theme)
 "Do as I say" (Paradox Live, as character Dongha Yeon)
 "True Pride" (Paradox Live, as character Dongha Yeon)
 "Nobody But Me" (Paradox Live, as character Dongha Yeon)

References

External links 
  

 Seiyuu Info
 Marina Inoue at Hitoshi Doi's Seiyuu Database
 
 
 

1985 births
Living people
Aoni Production voice actors
Gakushuin University alumni
Japanese women pop singers
Japanese video game actresses
Japanese voice actresses
Singers from Tokyo
Sony Music Entertainment Japan artists
Voice actresses from Tokyo
21st-century Japanese actresses
21st-century Japanese women singers
21st-century Japanese singers